Yacoub Sidi Ethmane (Arabic: يعقوب سيدي عثمان; born 10 December 1995) is a Mauritanian professional footballer who plays as a midfielder for Linafoot club Vita Club and the Mauritania national team.

International career 
Yacoub has scored one goal for Mauritania; it came in a 4–1 friendly loss to Algeria on 3 June 2021.

Career statistics

International goals 

 Mauritania score listed first, score column indicates score after each Yacoub goal.

Honours 
Nouadhibou
 Ligue 1 Mauritania: 2018–19, 2019–20

References

External links 
 
 

1995 births
Living people
People from Nouakchott
Mauritanian footballers
Association football midfielders
FC Nouadhibou players
AS Vita Club players
Super D1 players
Linafoot players
Mauritania international footballers
2021 Africa Cup of Nations players
Mauritanian expatriate footballers
Expatriate footballers in the Democratic Republic of the Congo
Mauritanian expatriate sportspeople in the Democratic Republic of the Congo
Mauritania A' international footballers
2022 African Nations Championship players